Ece Erken (born May 11, 1978) is a Turkish TV-hostess and actress.

Biography
Ece Erken was born in the city of Samsun, Turkey in 1978. She did her education in Beşiktaş Atatürk Anadolu Lisesi in Istanbul. So far Erken has worked at BRT, Radyo Vizyon, Radyo Genç, Kral TV, Metropol FM, Alem FM, Show Radyo, Radyo Viva, Star TV, Fox TV, Kanal 6, Number 1 TV, Kanal 1 and TRT 1. She got married for the first time in 2007, but divorced in 2009. She has a son from her second marriage named Eymen, born on 15 April 2015.

Filmography

References

External links
 
 Official website

1978 births
Turkish television actresses
Turkish television presenters
Turkish women television presenters
Living people